Lauro Adolfo De Bosis (Rome, 9 December 1901 – Tyrrhenian Sea, 3 October 1931) was an Italian poet, aviator, and anti-fascist.

Life
Lauro de Bosis was born in 1901. His mother was Lillian Vernon, a New Englander, and his father, Adolfo, a minor poet and editor of the review, Convito. Their home was a type of intellectual salon. His father translated Shelley, while Lauro himself translated tragedies by Aeschylus and Sophocles, and Frazer's Golden Bough. At university he studied chemistry.

Anti-fascism
De Bosis became quickly disillusioned with Mussolini after the 1924 murder of the anti-fascist politician Giacomo Matteotti. In 1928 he won a silver medal in the art competitions of the Olympic Games for his verse-drama "Icaro", an anti-fascist allegory disguised as a retelling of the Greek myth. That same year he met actress Ruth Draper and commenced a relationship that continued until his death.

De Bosis shuttled back and forth between Italy and the United States, where he taught Italian literature at Harvard. In the summer of 1930, De Bosis resigned from the Italy-America Society to found the "Alleanza Nazionale" and concentrate on the group's mission—the clandestine circulation of anti-Fascist newsletters in Italy. Inspired by another anti-Fascist who earlier had flown over Milan dropping leaflets denouncing Il Duce, de Bosis decided to embark upon a similar flight over Rome. The following summer De Bosis took flying lessons.
 

On 3 October 1931, with only seven-and-a-half hours flying time and a partially filled fuel tank, De Bosis took off from Marseille on a small Klemm L 25, heading for Corsica and then Italy. He reached Rome and circled for half an hour over the city centre, including Piazza Venezia – where Mussolini was sitting in council – dropping thousands of antifascist leaflets during the crowded evening hour. He was gone by the time the Italian Air Forces responded. The small wooden plane headed out to sea for Corsica never to be seen again. According to the pilots who had fuelled the plane, he was an inexperienced pilot and had told them that he intended to fly from Nice to Barcelona and back, so his plane had not been fully fuelled. A promising poet, at the time of his death he had been editing a volume of Italian poetry for the Oxford University Press. His papers are saved in Houghton Library, Harvard University.

In 1938, actress Ruth Draper made an endowment to maintain a lecture series on Italian culture, history and society, named after De Bosis in Harvard University. In 1973 more funds were supplied by Fiat's Giovanni Agnelli Foundation. De Bosis Committee now grants postdoctoral fellowships, invites visiting professors and organizes Colloquia in Italian studies.

Thornton Wilder dedicated his novel Ides of March (1948) to him.

References

Further reading
 Diggins, John P. Mussolini and Fascism. The view from America. Princeton: Princeton UP, 1972, 430.
 De Bosis, L. The Story of My Death. English translation by Ruth Draper. Oxford University Press, 1933

External links

 Olympic profile 
 Pressrelease 
 Lauro De Bosis papers, 1917-1933: Guide. Harvard University Library
 De Bosis Colloquium in Italian Studies: Audio interviews

1901 births
1931 deaths
20th-century Italian poets
20th-century Italian male writers
20th-century Italian translators
Harvard University faculty
Italian male poets
Italian aviators
Italian anti-fascists
Italian people of American descent
Aviators killed in aviation accidents or incidents
Missing aviators
Medalists at the 1928 Summer Olympics
Olympic silver medalists for Italy
Olympic silver medalists in art competitions
Olympic competitors in art competitions
People who died at sea
Victims of aviation accidents or incidents in 1931